We Think the World of You  is a 1988 film directed by Colin Gregg and starring Gary Oldman and Alan Bates. It is adapted from the 1960 J.R. Ackerley novel of the same name. It was produced by Tomasso Jandelli and Cinecom Pictures.

Plot
In post-war London an aimless young married bisexual man, Johnny, is sent to prison. He is forced to entrust his beloved Alsatian dog, Evie, to the reluctant care of his down-trodden parents and older, middle-class ex-lover and best friend, Frank. After a series of visits to Johnny's parents' home, Frank bonds with the dog whose mischievous spirit reminds him of his incarcerated friend. As it becomes apparent to Frank that Johnny's father is beating the dog, who is left for days on end in a small yard, a class war erupts over Evie's welfare, exacerbated by Johnny's manipulative and antagonistic wife Megan, whose sole aim is to claim Johnny back from Frank on his forthcoming release. A set of tragi-comic relationships evolve with the dog coming to represent the hold they have over each other.

Cast
 Alan Bates as Frank Meadows
 Max Wall as Tom
 Liz Smith as Millie
 Frances Barber as Megan
 Gary Oldman as Johnny
 Barbara New as Mrs. Grant

Reception
We Think the World of You has not garnered enough reviews at Rotten Tomatoes to produce an overall rating. Roger Ebert gave the film 3/4 stars, writing: "This is a film that rewards attention. It is wise and perceptive about human nature and it sees how all of us long for love and freedom as well as how the undeserved, unrequited love of an animal is sometimes so much more meaningful than the crabbed, grudging, selfish terms that are often laid down by human beings."

References

External links 
 
 Original Roger Ebert Review
 

1988 films
1988 drama films
1988 LGBT-related films
American LGBT-related films
British drama films
Films about dogs
Films based on British novels
Films about pets
Films set in London
1980s English-language films
1980s American films
1980s British films